is a former Japanese football player who last played for Nagano Parceiro.

Club career
Unozawa was born in Matsudo on 3 May 1983. He joined J1 League club Kashiwa Reysol from youth team in 2002. He played many matches as forward from first season. However he could not score many goals and Reysol was relegated to J2 League end of 2005 season. Reysol won the 2nd place in 2006 season and was returned to J1 in a year. However he left Reysol end of 2006 season without playing J1 and moved to J2 club Avispa Fukuoka in 2007. However he could not play many matches in Avispa. In 2008, he moved to Regional Leagues club Japan Soccer College. He played many matches and scored many goals in 2 seasons.

In 2010, he moved to Regional Leagues club Nagano Parceiro. Parceiro was promoted to Japan Football League from 2011. He scored many goals every season and became a top scorer in 2013 season. Parceiro also won the champions in 2013 season and was promoted to new league J3 League. He has been a key-symbol for the club, opting to retire at the end of the 2019 season, after playing just four games in that year.

National team career
In November 2003, Unozawa was selected Japan U-20 national team for 2003 World Youth Championship. But he did not play in the match.

Club statistics
.

References

External links

1983 births
Living people
Association football people from Chiba Prefecture
Japanese footballers
J1 League players
J2 League players
J3 League players
Japan Football League players
Kashiwa Reysol players
Avispa Fukuoka players
Japan Soccer College players
AC Nagano Parceiro players
Association football forwards